In linear algebra, if  are  complex matrices for some nonnegative integer , and  (the zero matrix), then the matrix pencil of degree  is the matrix-valued function defined on the complex numbers  

We denote it briefly with the notation .

A pencil is called regular if there is at least one value of  such that . The set of the eigenvalues is called the spectrum of the pencil and is written .
Moreover, the pencil is said to have one or more eigenvalues at infinity if  has one or more 0 eigenvalues.

Applications
Matrix pencils play an important role in numerical linear algebra. The problem of finding the eigenvalues of a pencil is called the generalized eigenvalue problem. The most popular algorithm for this task is the QZ algorithm, which is an implicit version of the QR algorithm to solve the associated eigenvalue problem  without forming explicitly the matrix  (which could be impossible or ill-conditioned if  is singular or near-singular)

Pencil generated by commuting matrices
 consists only of matrices similar to a diagonal matrix, or
 has no matrices in it similar to a diagonal matrix, or
 has exactly one matrix in it similar to a diagonal matrix.

See also 
 Generalized eigenvalue problem
 Generalized pencil-of-function method
 Nonlinear eigenproblem
 Quadratic eigenvalue problem
 Generalized Rayleigh quotient

Notes

References
 
 

Linear algebra